= Villa San Marcial =

Coordinates: 32°10′S 58°56′W

- Municipality and village
- Interactive map of Villa San Marcial
- Country: Argentina
- Province: Entre Ríos Province
- Time zone: UTC−3 (ART)

Villa San Marcial is a village and municipality in Entre Ríos Province in north-eastern Argentina.
